Better Late Than Never is a 2004 album by the band Eddie and the Hot Rods. It was the first album of new material from the current line-up featuring Barrie Masters and was originally released in 2004 on MSJ Records with alternative cover art by Viz comic artist, Simon Thorp.

Track listing
All songs written by Richard Holgarth except where noted.
"Bad Time Again" – 3:29
"Need Your Touch" – 3:08
"Ain't No 9 to 5" – 3:19
"Better Without You" – 4:38
"Deep Blue Interceptor" – 3:07
"I'm Gonna Be Your Man" – 3:32
"Sympathy" – 3:40
"Not Enough" – 3:58
"Bad Man" – 3:08
"Shut up and Listen" – 3:45
"Once Bitten Twice Shy" (Ian Hunter) – 4:41
"High Society" – 3:06
"Woolly Bully" (Domingo Samudio) – 3:20
"Hard Driving Man" – 2:53

Personnel
Eddie and the Hot Rods
Barrie Masters – vocals
Richard Holgarth – guitar, keyboards, backing vocals
Chris Taylor – guitar, backing vocals
Simon Bowley – drums, backing vocals
Dipster Dean - bass guitar, backing vocals

References

2004 albums
Eddie and the Hot Rods albums